The ICC Under-19 Women's Cricket World Cup is an international cricket tournament organised by the International Cricket Council (ICC) contested by national women's under-19 teams. The first tournament took place in January 2023 in South Africa, with matches being played in the Twenty20 cricket format. India won the inaugural tournament, defeating England in the final.

History
The inaugural tournament was scheduled to take place in January 2021, before being moved back to December 2021 due to the COVID-19 pandemic. In January 2021, the Bangladesh Cricket Board stated that they would host the tournament, but it was later postponed for a second time and moved to January 2023, with the ICC looking for a host nation. 

The inaugural tournament eventually took place in January 2023 in South Africa, with sixteen teams competing. India won the competition, defeating England in the final by seven wickets.

Malaysia and Thailand will jointly host the 2025 ICC Under-19 Women's T20 World Cup, with Bangladesh and Nepal jointly hosting the 2027 event.

Summary

Performance of teams 

Note:
 Teams are sorted by their best performance, then winning percentage, then (if equal) by alphabetical order.

Team results by tournament

Debutant teams in each tournament

Tournament records

References

2021